The  is a Japanese samurai kin group.

History
The clan claims descent from Abe Hirafu and Abe Nakamaro. During the Kamakura period, the clan served as the Presiding Governors of Ezo. The clan served the Tokugawa clan during Edo Period. Their first recorded family head, Andō Naotsugu was eldest son of Andō Haruyoshi and grandson of Andō Ieshige, retainer of Matsudaira Hirotada (father of Tokugawa Ieyasu).

Head family (ruled Kii-Tanabe domain)
 Andō Naotsugu (1555–1635)
 Andō Naoharu (1607–1636)
 Andō Yoshikado (1636–1654)
 Andō Naokiyo (1633–1692)
 Andō Naona (1680–1708)
 Andō Nobutake (1688–1717)
 Andō Nobusada (1717–1725)
 Andō Katsuyoshi (1715–1730)
 Andō Tsuguyuki (1716–1765)
 Andō Hironaga (1747–1771)
 Andō Tsugunori (1749–1827)
 Andō Michinori (1760–1825)
 Andō Naotomo (1790–1809)
 Andō Michinori (1780–1823) (2nd)
 Andō Naoka (1786–1826)
 Andō Naohiro (1821–1858)
 Andō Naoyuki (1858–1908)
 Andō Naotada

Branch Family
First head family was Andō Nobushige, younger brother of Andō Naotsugu, son of Andō Haruyoshi and grandson of Andō Ieshige

Head Family
 Andō Shigenobu (1557–1621) of Takasaki Domain
 Andō Shigenaga (1600–1657) of Takasaki Domain
 Andō Shigehiro (1640–1698) of Takasaki Domain and Bitchū-Matsuyama Domain
 Andō Nobutomo (1671–1732) of Bitchū-Matsuyama Domain and Kanō Domain
 Andō Nobutada (1717–1771) of Kanō Domain
 Andō Nobunari (1743–1810) of Kanō Domain and Iwakitaira Domain
 Andō Nobukiyo (1768–1812) of Iwakitaira Domain
 Andō Nobuyoshi (1785–1844) of Iwakitaira Domain
 Andō Nobuyori (1801–1847) of Iwakitaira Domain
 Andō Nobumasa of Iwakitaira Domain
 Andō Nobutami (1859–1863) of Iwakitaira Domain
 Andō Nobutake (1849–1908) of Iwakitaira Domain
 Andō Nobuuji

References

External links
 安藤氏 at Harimaya.com 

 
Japanese clans